Radhanagore (also spelled Radhanagar) in the khanakul Town  Arambagh subdivision of the Hooghly District of West Bengal, India. It is the birthplace of Raja Rammohun Roy. Located near Khanakul, it is approachable from Tarakeswar or Arambag. Mundeswari river flows nearby.

The Raja's ancestral home and ruins of the house he built at the Langulpara cremation ground are still there. A college has been established in his name in the Town of khanakul.

Kamarpukur, also in Hooghly District, birthplace of Sri Ramkrishna and Birsingha in Paschim Medinipur, birthplace of Iswar Chandra Vidyasagar are near Radhanagore.

Geography

Area overview
The Arambagh subdivision, presented in the map alongside, is divided into two physiographic parts – the Dwarakeswar River being the dividing line. The western part is upland and rocky – it is extension of the terrain of neighbouring Bankura district. The eastern part is flat alluvial plain area.  The railways, the roads and flood-control measures have had an impact on the area. The area is overwhelmingly rural with 94.77% of the population living in rural areas and 5.23% of the population living in urban areas.

Note: The map alongside presents some of the notable locations in the subdivision. All places marked in the map are linked in the larger full screen map.

Gram panchayats
Khanakul-I Block has two gram panchayats named Rammohan-I and Rammohan-II covering both Radhanagar and Langulpara.

Rammohan-I covers the following villages: Gaurangapur, Jagannathpur, Amarpur, Jakri, Sarda, Kalimba, Raghunathpur, Langulpara, Sahanpur, Chak Sonatikri, Dhamla, Paschim Radhanagar, and Senpur. Rammohan-II covers the following villages: Shrirampur, Kaiba, Atghara, Sekendarpur, Gobindapur, Khamargor, Maikhanda, and Helan.

Demographics
Paschim Radhanagar had a population of 2,220 and Langulpara of 1,638. Purba Radhanagar with a population of 4,878 is part of Balipur panchayat.

Education
Raja Rammohan Roy Mahavidyalaya, a general degree college, was established at Radhanagore in 1964.

Notable people
 Rammohan Roy

References

Villages in Hooghly district